Bentzen is a surname. Notable people with the surname include:

Amund Nøkleby Bentzen (1903–1969), Norwegian priest and politician
Carl Severin Bentzen (1882–1956), Norwegian tailor and politician
Erling Bentzen (1897–1962), Norwegian newspaper editor and politician
Hulda Marie Bentzen (1858–1930), Norwegian photographer
Jens Dall Bentzen (born 1968), Danish engineer
Torfinn Bentzen (1912–1986), Norwegian jurist and sports official

See also
Bentsen